St. Lawrence O'Toole Catholic Church is a historic former Catholic church at 618 Main in Central City, South Dakota. Built in 1879, it is a one-story frame, vernacular style building with a gable roof. It was added to the National Register of Historic Places in 2003.

Originally built in Central City's business district, it now lies in a residential neighborhood. In 2007 its neighbors purchased it, originally intending to demolish it. Upon learning it was a historic structure, they instead have been working to restore it, using grants from Deadwood Historic Preservation to the municipal government.

References

Churches in the Roman Catholic Diocese of Rapid City
Former Roman Catholic church buildings in South Dakota
Churches on the National Register of Historic Places in South Dakota
Roman Catholic churches completed in 1879
Churches in Lawrence County, South Dakota
National Register of Historic Places in Lawrence County, South Dakota
1879 establishments in Dakota Territory
19th-century Roman Catholic church buildings in the United States